Austrodrillia is a genus of sea snails, marine gastropod mollusks in the family Horaiclavidae.

It was previously categorized within Crassispirinae, Turridae.

Description
The small shell is very solid, subcylindrical or claviform. The sculpture consists of nodose ribs that do not attain the suture, and fine spiral threads which are most dense at the summit of the whorl. There is no epidermis. The protoconch consists of two smooth and elevate whorls. The aperture is wide, without varix or internal armature. The outer lip is simple. The wide sinus is U-shaped, its right margin resting on a massive insertion callus. The fasciole is indistinguishable.

Distribution
This marine genus occurs off Australia and New Zealand. One species is found in the Atlantic Ocean off St. Helena.

Species
Species within the genus Austrodrillia include:
 Austrodrillia agrestis (Verco, 1909)
 Austrodrillia albobalteata (E. A. Smith, 1890)
 Austrodrillia angasi (Crosse, 1863)
 Austrodrillia beraudiana (Crosse, 1863)
 Austrodrillia dimidiata (Sowerby III, 1896)
 Austrodrillia hinomotoensis Kuroda, Habe & Oyama, 1971
 Austrodrillia rawitensis Hedley, 1922
 Austrodrillia saxea (Sowerby III, 1896)
 Austrodrillia secunda Powell, 1965
 Austrodrillia sola Powell, 1942
 Austrodrillia subplicata (Verco, 1909)

Species brought into synonymy
 Austrodrillia achatina Verco, J.C., 1909: synonym of  Austrodrillia dimidiata (Sowerby III, 1896)
 † Austrodrillia alpha L. C. King, 1933: synonym of  † Aoteadrillia alpha (L. C. King, 1933)
 Austrodrillia burnupi (Sowerby III, 1897): synonym of Tylotiella burnupi (Sowerby III, 1897)
 † Austrodrillia cinctuta Marwick, 1929: synonym of † Mauidrillia clavicula Powell, 1942
 † Austrodrillia consequens C.R. Laws, 1936: synonym of † Aoteadrillia consequens (Laws, 1936) 
 † Austrodrillia koruahinensis Bartrum & Powell, 1928: synonym of † Splendrillia koruahinensis (Bartrum & Powell, 1928)
 Austrodrillia hottentota (E. A. Smith, 1882): synonym of Tylotiella hottentota (E. A. Smith, 1882)
 Austrodrillia nenia (Hedley, 1903): synonym of Splendrillia nenia (Hedley, 1903)
 Austrodrillia praetermissa (E. A. Smith, 1904): synonym of Naudedrillia praetermissa (E. A. Smith, 1904)
 Austrodrillia woodsi (Beddome, 1883): synonym of Splendrillia woodsi (Beddome, 1883)

References

 Bouchet P., Kantor Yu.I., Sysoev A. & Puillandre N. (2011) A new operational classification of the Conoidea. Journal of Molluscan Studies 77: 273-308.

External links
  Tucker, J.K. 2004 Catalog of recent and fossil turrids (Mollusca: Gastropoda). Zootaxa 682:1-1295.
 Specimen at MNHN, Paris

 
Horaiclavidae
Gastropod genera